Latyan Dam (also Romanized as Sadd-e Latyān) is a buttress dam on the Jajrood River, located less than 25 km from Tehran in the south of city of Lavasan. It is one of the main sources of water for Tehran metropolitan region. It was constructed between 1963 and 1967. The first generator in the dam's 45 MW hydroelectric power station was commissioned on 17 March 1969, the second on 13 April 1987.

Geology
Jajrood River basin is located in the southern part of central Alborz mountain range, the rocks of which date from the Palaeozoic era up to the Quaternary period, as below: 
 Palaeozoic era: The dolomitic rocks, sandstone and limestone. Belong to Devonian, Carboniferous and Permian periods. 
 Mesozoic era: The sandstone formation and limestones of Teriace and Shemshak (Lower Jurassic) coal formation with sandstone and fossiliferous limestones belong to this era. 
 Paleogene period: starts with lower and middle Eocene limestone layers with nummulite fossil and continues with the Alborz green layers. (Green tuffs) which is an indication of submarine volcanic, eruptions and were belongs to upper Eocene. 
 Quaternary period: The basaltic masses in the alluvial deposits which cover a big area in the region belong to this era.

Location within Alborz Range

References

External links

 Profile at soil-water.com

Dams in Tehran Province
Buildings and structures in Tehran Province
Dams completed in 1967
Buttress dams
Energy infrastructure completed in 1987
Hydroelectric power stations in Iran